Blue Jeans a'Swinging is the first UK studio album by British beat band The Swinging Blue Jeans, released in November 1964 on HMV.

Track listing

Personnel

The Swinging Blue Jeans
 Ray Ennis – rhythm guitar
 Ralph Ellis – lead guitar
 Les Braid - bass, keyboards
 Norman Kuhlke – drums

Technical
 Walter J. Ridley – producer, photography
 John Chilton – liner notes

References

External links
Discogs.com
Itunes.apple.com

1964 albums